Nemanthias is a genus of marine ray-finned fish in the subfamily Anthiinae of the family Serranidae, the groupers and sea basses. It is a monotypic genus containing the single species Nemanthias carberryi, the threadfin anthias, which is native to the western Indian Ocean. It is found at depths of 10–30 meters on coral reefs.

Description
The dorsal fin has 11 spines and 16 to 17 soft rays, while the anal fin has three spines and seven soft rays. The first two dorsal spines are long and flexible. The upper lip is thickened and has a nipple-like papilla in the centre. Juvenile fish have an extra small dorsal spine at first. The cornea of the eye exhibits a marked iridescence which changes from greeish-blue to orange, depending on the angle of view; electron microscopy shows that this is due to the angled lamellae on the surface.

References

Anthiinae
Marine fish genera
Monotypic fish genera